Skipton bus station is a small bus station that serves the town of Skipton, North Yorkshire, England.

The bus station is situated in Skipton town centre just off Keighley Road. There are eight stands at the bus station. The main operators are Transdev Blazefield (operating as the Keighley Bus Company, Burnley Bus Company, and York and Country), Stagecoach Merseyside & South Lancashire and Kirkby Lonsdale Coach Hire. Services that are not sustainable on a commercial level are provided by North Yorkshire County Council (NYCC) minibuses. National Express and Megabus also serve the bus station. Previously, Pride of the Dales, Pennine Motor Services and First Leeds operated services to the station.

History 
The original bus station was opened on 8 May 1950. A new bus station was built on the same site and it re-opened in January 2009. North Yorkshire County Council and Craven District Council invested £1.2 million for the facility.

The old bus station was known as Skipton Waller Hill Bus Station and was named after Waller Hill Beck that runs underneath it.

Services

Current 
59 Skipton–Harrogate

580 Skipton-Settle, connects with the 581 and 582 allowing journeys to Kirkby Lonsdale and Lancaster; operated by Kirkby Lonsdale Coach Hire.

784 Skipton-Otley - operated by Transdev York and Country.

Pendle Wizz Skipton-Burnley- Follows the old route of the X43 between Skipton and Burnley; operated by Burnley Bus Company.

66 Dalesway Skipton-Keighley- operated by Keighley Bus Company.

72 Skipton-Grassington- operated by Keighley Bus Company.

280 Preston–Skipton - previously operated by Preston Bus, now operated by Stagecoach Merseyside & South Lancashire.

873, 884 'CravenLink' Ilkley-Skipton- operated by Keighley Bus Company on Sundays only.

12, 14, 71, 73, 75, 78A, 79, 210 and 211- local services operated by NYCC Fleet Services.

Former 
X43 Skipton-Manchester- curtailed to Burnley in June 2020, was operated by Burnley Bus Company.

X84 Skipton-Leeds- Limited stop service to Leeds via Otley. Stopped operating during the COVID-19 pandemic; it has since been reinstated as far as Ilkley. (This is now permanent - new 784 Otley - Skipton service instead.)

References

Bus stations in England
Skipton
Transport in North Yorkshire